Lignyoptera fumidaria is a species of moth of the family Geometridae first described by Jacob Hübner in 1825. It is found in eastern Austria, Hungary, Bulgaria and eastern Russia.

The wingspan is 27–30 mm for males. Females have reduced wings. Adults are on wing from October to December.

In captivity the larvae have been recorded feeding on Achillea millerfolium, Galatella linosyris, Centaurea scabiosa, Salvia pratensis, Plantago and Inula species. The species overwinters as an egg.

References

External links
Lepiforum e.V.
"Lignyoptera fumidaria (Hübner, 1825)". European Butterflies and Moths. Archived April 16, 2013.

Moths described in 1825
Ennominae
Moths of Europe